Yvonne Theresa Suhor (November 29, 1961 – September 27, 2018) was an American actress and acting instructor.

Early life and education 
Suhor was born in New Orleans, Louisiana. She graduated from Illinois State University in 1985, and later received her MFA from the University of Southern California.

Career 
Suhor appeared in a number of movies and TV series, most notably as Cicely in an Emmy Award-winning episode of Northern Exposure and as series regular Louise McCloud for three seasons on The Young Riders. She also guest-starred on Brooklyn Bridge (in a recurring role), Murder, She Wrote, Star Trek: Voyager, Renegade, and Sheena. Suhor's theatre credits included Steppenwolf's The Grapes of Wrath and Lydie Breeze, and she was a two-time Jeff Award nominee.

Suhor also ran her own acting school, Art's Sake Film Acting Studio in Orlando, Florida, teaching film acting based on the Meisner technique.

Personal life 
Suhor died on September 27, 2018, after a 10-month illness with pancreatic cancer. She was married to actor Simon Needham.

Filmography

Television

References

External links
 
 Interview with Yvonne Suhor

1961 births
2018 deaths
Actresses from New Orleans
American television actresses
Illinois State University alumni
University of Southern California alumni
Deaths from pancreatic cancer
21st-century American women